The 2019 Northern Arizona Lumberjacks football team represented Northern Arizona University in the 2019 NCAA Division I FCS football season. They were led by 1st-year head coach Chris Ball and played their home games at the Walkup Skydome. They were members of the Big Sky Conference. They finished the season 4–8, 2–6 in Big Sky play to finish in a five-way tie for ninth place.

Previous season
The Lumberjacks finished the 2018 season 4–6, 3–4 in Big Sky play to finish in eighth place.

On November 19, Jerome Souers announced his retirement. He finished with a 21 year record of 123–114.

Preseason

Big Sky preseason poll
The Big Sky released their preseason media and coaches' polls on July 15, 2019. The Lumberjacks were picked to finish in sixth place in both polls.

Preseason All–Big Sky team
The Lumberjacks had two players selected to the preseason all-Big Sky team.

Defense

Jalen Goss – DT

Khalil Dorsey – CB

Schedule

Source:

Game summaries

Missouri State

at Arizona

Western New Mexico

at Illinois State

at Montana State

Northern Colorado

at Weber State

Portland State

at Eastern Washington

Sacramento State

at Southern Utah

Idaho

Ranking movements

References

Northern Arizona
Northern Arizona Lumberjacks football seasons
Northern Arizona Lumberjacks football